This is chronological list of action films originally released in the 2000s. Some films are of hybrid genres, including horror, comedy, and science fiction films; the list should attempt to document films which are more closely related to action, even if they bend genres.

2000

2001

2002

2003

2004

2005

2006

2007

2009

See also
 Action films
 Martial arts films
 Swashbuckler films

Notes

2000s
 
Action